Robert H. Briggs is a Fullerton, California, lawyer and independent historian.  , Briggs's area of historical research related to violence in frontier Utah, in particular the Mountain Meadows Massacre of 1857.

A member of the Miller Eccles Study Group's board of directors, Briggs also wrote "The Tragedy at Mountain Meadows Massacre: Toward a Consensus Account and Time Line," as well as  reviews of Sally Denton's American Massacre, Will Bagley’s Blood of the Prophets, and Richard E. Turley, Jr. et al's Massacre at Mountain Meadows. In 2010, he contributed the article, within this larger philosophical theme, provocatively titled "Mormonism and Violence" to Mormonism: A Historical Encyclopedia.

Notes

External links
 "Tragedy at Mountain Meadows Massacre: Toward a Consensus Account and Time Line" – Monograph, Dixie State College of Utah
 "The Mountain Meadows Massacre: An Analytical Narrative Based on Participant Confessions" – Monograph, Utah Historical Quarterly (2006) 
 Sally Denton's American Massacre: Authentic Mormon Past versus the Danite Interpretation of History – Book review, FARMS Review, (2004) Brigham Young University 
 A Scholarly Look at the Disastrous Mountain Meadows Massacre, – 2008 FARMS Review, Brigham Young University 
 "Wrestling Brigham" – Review of Blood of the Prophets: Brigham Young and the Massacre at Mountain Meadows, December 2002 Sunstone Magazine
 

American military historians
American male non-fiction writers
Historians of the Latter Day Saint movement
Historians of Utah
Living people
Mormon studies scholars
Year of birth missing (living people)